Nick Bracks (born 5 March 1987) is an Australian actor, published author, mental health advocate, male model, entrepreneur, and speaker who has delivered several TED talks and over 1,000 mental health seminars. Bracks is the founder of mental health media company Move Your Mind and the Move Your Mind podcast. He played "Brandon Danker" on Australian soap opera Neighbours and appeared in a number of reality television shows including Dancing with the Stars and Celebrity Splash!. Bracks is also a fashion designer who released his own underwear label known as underBRACKS. 

In 2007, at the age of 20, he was involved in a single vehicle accident near his family home in Williamstown. A passenger friend was injured in the accident. Bracks was charged with drink driving and traffic offences. He speaks publicly about his battle with depression and has spent the last 15 years using his profile to raise awareness about mental illness. Bracks resides between Melbourne and New York City.

Career 
Bracks was discovered by American Crew in 2009 and his modelling portfolio includes Myer, David Jones and GQ magazine. In 2011, he made the final of the Cleo Bachelor of the year contest. Bracks appeared as a contestant in the 11th season of television reality show Dancing with the Stars in 2011. He also made appearances on reality television series Brynne: My Bedazzled Life and in 2012, he appeared on the cover of the Australian magazine DNA. In 2013, he appeared as a contestant in the television reality show Celebrity Splash!.

Bracks released his own underwear label known as underBRACKS in October 2013. He launched his underwear collection with the up-market Australian department store Myer. The line was available at all stores and online until late 2015, when Myer dropped the underperforming brand as part of a refreshed brand strategy. Early 2022, Bracks relaunched the brand with a portion of profits going to mental health charity One in Five.

In 2017, Bracks landed a guest role on Australian soap opera Neighbours playing “Brandon Danker”(2017-2018).

Bracks has also been involved in multiple start-ups, including an espresso bar and bakery on Bourke Street in Melbourne, Australia called The Lobby 601.

Bracks launched a mental health media company and podcast called Move Your Mind in 2020 and is actively working on Mental Health Awareness within the public and private sector. In 2021, Bracks published his first book Move Your Mind.

References

External links
 Official website
IMDb Profile
Instagram
Twitter

Living people
1987 births
Australian male models
Models from Melbourne